Urtil is a rural locality (a selo) in Lyakhlinsky Selsoviet, Khivsky District, Republic of Dagestan, Russia. The population was 158 as of 2010.

Geography 
Urtil is located 24 km north of Khiv (the district's administrative centre) by road. Kuvig is the nearest rural locality.

References 

Rural localities in Khivsky District